The following outline is provided as an overview of and topical guide to Andhra Pradesh:

Andhra Pradesh – one of the 29 states of India, situated on the southeastern coast of the country. The state is the eighth largest state in India covering an area of 160,205 km2 (61,855 sq mi).[3] As per 2011 census of India, the state is tenth largest by population with 49,386,799 inhabitants. On 2 June 2014, the north-western portion of the state was bifurcated to form a new state of Telangana. In accordance with the Andhra Pradesh Reorganisation Act, 2014, Hyderabad will remain the de jure capital of both Andhra Pradesh and Telangana states for a period of time not exceeding 10 years.

General reference

Names 
 Common name: Andhra Pradesh
 Pronunciation: 
 Native name =  ఆంధ్రప్రదేశ్
 Official name: Andhra Pradesh
 Nicknames
 "Rice Bowl of India"
 "Egg bowl of Asia"
 "Sunrise Country"
 Adjectivals 
 Telugu
 Demonyms
 Telugu
 Abbreviations and name codes
 ISO 3166-2 code:  IN-AP
 Vehicle registration code: AP

Rankings (amongst India's states) 

 by population (2011 census): 10th
 by area: 7th
 by crime rate (2015): 12th
 by gross domestic product (GDP) (2014): 11th
 by Human Development Index (HDI): 15th
 by life expectancy at birth: 13th
 by literacy rate: 25

Geography of Andhra Pradesh 

Geography of Andhra Pradesh
 Andhra Pradesh is: an Indian state, a state of the Republic of India.

Location of Andhra Pradesh 
 Location:
 Northern Hemisphere
 Eastern Hemisphere
 Eurasia
 Asia
 South Asia
 Indian subcontinent
 India
 South India
 Time zone:  Indian Standard Time (UTC+05:30)

Places in Andhra Pradesh 

Places in Andhra Pradesh
 Highest point: Arma Konda
 Monuments in Andhra Pradesh
 List of state protected Monuments in Andhra Pradesh
 List of Monuments of National Importance in Andhra Pradesh

Environment of Andhra Pradesh 

 Climate of Andhra Pradesh
 Monsoon
 Natural vegetation and wildlife of Andhra Pradesh
 Fauna of Andhra Pradesh
 List of birds of Andhra Pradesh

Geographic features of Andhra Pradesh 

 Beaches of Andhra Pradesh
 Coastline of Andhra Pradesh
Rivers in Andhra Pradesh
 Mountains of Andhra Pradesh
 Eastern Ghats jindagad is the highest peak in AP.

Protected areas of Andhra Pradesh 

 Wildlife sanctuaries – Andhra Pradesh has six Wildlife Sanctuaries:
 Kambalakonda Wildlife Sanctuary
 Papikonda Wildlife Sanctuary
 Coringa Wildlife Sanctuary
 Krishna Wildlife Sanctuary
 Rollapadu Wildlife Sanctuary
 Sri Penusila Narasimha Wildlife Sanctuary
 National parks of Andhra Pradesh
Sri Venkateswara National Park
Indira Gandhi Zoological Park

Regions of Andhra Pradesh 
 Coastal Andhra
 Rayalaseema

Administrative divisions
 Andhra Pradesh Capital Region
 Andhra Pradesh Capital Region Development Authority
 List of revenue divisions in Andhra Pradesh

Districts of Andhra Pradesh 

Districts of Andhra Pradesh – Andhra Pradesh is subdivided into 13 districts
 Anantapur district
 Chittoor district
 East Godavari district
 Guntur district
 Kadapa district
 Kurnool district
 Krishna district
 Prakasam district
 Nellore district
 Srikakulam district
 Visakhapatnam district
 Vizianagaram district
 West Godavari district

Mandals of Andhra Pradesh 
 Mandals in Andhra Pradesh

Municipalities of Andhra Pradesh 
 Municipalities in Andhra Pradesh
 Urban agglomerations in Andhra Pradesh
 Cities in Andhra Pradesh by area
 Cities in Andhra Pradesh by population
 Major cities in Andhra Pradesh
 Visakhapatnam
 Vijayawada
 Revenue divisions in Andhra Pradesh

Demographics of Andhra Pradesh 

Demographics of Andhra Pradesh

Government and politics of Andhra Pradesh 

Politics of Andhra Pradesh
 Political families of Andhra Pradesh
 Political parties
 Telugu Desam Party
 YSR Congress Party

Elections in Andhra Pradesh 

Elections in Andhra Pradesh
 Andhra Pradesh State Election Commission
 1955 Andhra Pradesh Legislative Assembly election
 1983 Andhra Pradesh Legislative Assembly election
 1985 Andhra Pradesh Legislative Assembly election
 1989 Andhra Pradesh Legislative Assembly election
 1994 Andhra Pradesh Legislative Assembly election
 1999 Andhra Pradesh Legislative Assembly election
 2004 Andhra Pradesh Legislative Assembly election
 2009 Andhra Pradesh Legislative Assembly election
 2014 Andhra Pradesh Legislative Assembly election
 2012 Andhra Pradesh by-election
2019 Andhra Pradesh Legislative Assembly election

Union government in Andhra Pradesh 
 Rajya Sabha members from Andhra Pradesh
 Andhra Pradesh Congress Committee
 Indian general election, 1962 (Andhra Pradesh)
 Indian general election, 1967 (Andhra Pradesh)
 Indian general election, 1971 (Andhra Pradesh)
 Indian general election, 1977 (Andhra Pradesh)
 Indian general election, 1980 (Andhra Pradesh)
 Indian general election, 1984 (Andhra Pradesh)
 Indian general election, 1989 (Andhra Pradesh)
 Indian general election, 1991 (Andhra Pradesh)
 Indian general election, 1996 (Andhra Pradesh)
 Indian general election, 1998 (Andhra Pradesh)
 Indian general election, 1999 (Andhra Pradesh)
 Indian general election, 2004 (Andhra Pradesh)
 Indian general election, 2009 (Andhra Pradesh)
 Indian general election, 2014 (Andhra Pradesh)
Indian general election, 2019 (Andhra Pradesh)

Branches of the government of Andhra Pradesh 

Government of Andhra Pradesh

Executive branch 

 Governors
 Chief Ministers
 List of cabinet ministers of Andhra Pradesh
 Andhra Pradesh Secretariat

Legislative branch 

Andhra Pradesh Legislature
 Legislative Assembly
 List of constituencies of Andhra Pradesh Legislative Assembly
 Andhra Pradesh Legislative Council

Judicial branch 

 Andhra Pradesh High Court

Law and order in Andhra Pradesh 

 Andhra Pradesh and Madras Alteration of Boundaries Act
 Andhra Pradesh Reorganisation Act, 2014
 Law enforcement in Andhra Pradesh
 Anti-Corruption Bureau, Andhra Pradesh
 Andhra Pradesh Police
 Andhra Pradesh Police Academy

History of Andhra Pradesh 

History of Andhra Pradesh

History of Andhra Pradesh, by period

Prehistoric Andhra Pradesh

Ancient Andhra Pradesh

Medieval Andhra Pradesh

Colonial Andhra Pradesh

Contemporary Andhra Pradesh

History of Andhra Pradesh, by region

History of Andhra Pradesh, by subject

Culture of Andhra Pradesh 

Culture of Andhra Pradesh
 Games and toys of Andhra Pradesh
 Traditional games of Andhra Pradesh
 Kondapalli Toys
 Telugu language
 Tourism in Andhra Pradesh

The arts in Andhra Pradesh 

 Telugu cinema
 Telugu theatre
 Shadow puppets of Andhra Pradesh

Architecture in Andhra Pradesh 

 Temples of Andhra Pradesh

Dance in Andhra Pradesh 

 Kuchipudi
 Andhra Natyam
 Bhamakalapam
 Veeranatyam
 Vilasini Natyam

Literature of Andhra Pradesh 

Telugu literature
 Nannayya
 Tikkana
 Yerrapragada
 Kandukuri Veeresalingam

Music of Andhra Pradesh 

Music of Andhra Pradesh
 Annamacharya
 Tyagaraja
 Kshetrayya
 Bhadrachala Ramadas
 Ghantasala
 Burra katha

Cuisine of Andhra Pradesh 

Cuisine of Andhra Pradesh
 Telugu cuisine
 Pickles
 Gongura
 Avakaya
 Pootharekulu

Festivals in Andhra Pradesh 

 Ugadi (Telgu New Year)
 Sankranthi
 Dasara
 Vinayaka Chathurthi
 Eid ul-Fitr
 Easter
 Bakrid
 Deepavali

People of Andhra Pradesh 

 Telugu people
 Ethnic groups of Andhra Pradesh
 List of people from Andhra Pradesh

Religion in Andhra Pradesh 

Religion in Andhra Pradesh
 Christianity in Andhra Pradesh
 Lutheran Churches in Andhra Pradesh
 Hinduism in Andhra Pradesh
 Temples of Andhra Pradesh

Sports in Andhra Pradesh 

Sports in Andhra Pradesh
 Swarnandhra Pradesh Sports Complex
 Cricket in Andhra Pradesh
 Andhra Pradesh cricket team
 List of Andhra Pradesh cricketers
 Cricket grounds in Andhra Pradesh
 Andhra Pradesh Cricket Association
 Football in Andhra Pradesh
 Andhra Pradesh football team
 Motor sports in Andhra Pradesh
 Andhra Pradesh Motor Sports Club

Symbols of Andhra Pradesh 

Symbols of Andhra Pradesh
 Animal: Blackbuck
 Bird:   Indian roller
 Dance:  Kuchipudi
 Emblem of Andhra Pradesh
 Flower: Water lily
 Fruit:  Mango
 Song:   "Maa Telugu Thalliki"
 Sport: Kabaddi
 Tree:   Neem

Economy and infrastructure of Andhra Pradesh 

Economy of Andhra Pradesh
 Agriculture in Andhra Pradesh
 Andhra Pradesh Forest Department
 Economic development in Andhra Pradesh
 Andhra Pradesh Capital Region Development Authority
 The Federation of Andhra Pradesh Chambers of Commerce and Industry
 Andhra Pradesh Industrial Infrastructure Corporation
 Energy in Andhra Pradesh
 Power sector of Andhra Pradesh
 Transmission Corporation of Andhra Pradesh (electricity)
 Andhra Pradesh Power Generation Corporation
 Andhra Pradesh Central Power Distribution Company
 Free electricity to farmers (Andhra Pradesh)
 Tourism in Andhra Pradesh
 Andhra Pradesh Tourism Development Corporation
 Transport in Andhra Pradesh
 List of airports in Andhra Pradesh
 Rail transport in Andhra Pradesh
 Andhra Pradesh Express
 Andhra Pradesh Sampark Kranti Express
 Road system of Andhra Pradesh
 Andhra Pradesh State Road Transport Corporation
 List of State Highways in Andhra Pradesh
 State Highway 2 (Andhra Pradesh)
 State Highway 188 (Andhra Pradesh)
 Ports and harbours of Andhra Pradesh
 Water supply and sanitation in Andhra Pradesh
 List of dams and reservoirs in Andhra Pradesh

Education in Andhra Pradesh 

Education in Andhra Pradesh
 Andhra Pradesh Library Association
 Andhra Pradesh United Teachers Federation
 Primary education in Andhra Pradesh
 Andhra Pradesh Residential School, Kodigenahalli
 Andhra Pradesh Residential School, Sarvail
 Andhra Pradesh Residential School, Tadikonda
 Andhra Pradesh Board of Intermediate Education
 Andhra Pradesh Board of Secondary Education
 List of institutions of higher education in Andhra Pradesh
 Andhra Pradesh Residential Degree College
 Andhra Pradesh Open University

Health and safety in Andhra Pradesh 

 Andhra Pradesh Pollution Control Board
 Andhra Pradesh State Disaster Response and Fire Services Department

See also

 Outline of India
 Telugu language
 Telugu people
 Telugu script

 1977 Andhra Pradesh cyclone
 1990 Andhra Pradesh cyclone
 2009 Andhra Pradesh Chief Minister helicopter crash
 Andhra Pradesh (magazine)
 Andhra Pradesh Congress Committee
 Andhra Pradesh Housing Board
 Andhra Pradesh Mica Mine Workers Union
 Andhra Pradesh Public Service Commission
 Andhra Pradesh Randomized Evaluation Studies (APRESt)
 Andhra Pradesh State Handloom Weavers Cooperative Society
 Andhra Pradesh State Wakf Board
 Andhra Pradesh Vaidya Vidhana Parishad
 Fee Reimbursement Scheme (Andhra Pradesh)
 SC, ST Sub-Plan (Andhra Pradesh)
 Snake Cell Andhra Pradesh
 The Andhra Pradesh State Christian (Minorities) Finance Corporation

References

External links

 
 Andhra Pradesh Government Website
 Department of Tourism

 01
Andhra Pradesh
Andhra Pradesh